Fahmida Azim is a Bangladeshi-American illustrator and author known for her work in journalism.

Recognition
Azim was a co-winner of the first Pulitzer Prize for Illustrated Reporting, for her 2021 work "How I Escaped a Chinese Internment Camp". She also won the 2022 Golden Kite Award for Best Illustrated Book for Older Readers, for her illustrations in Samira Surfs by Rukhsanna Guidroz.

Personal life
Azim was born in Bangladesh in 1994, and moved to the United States with her parents when she was a child. She was raised in Virginia, and graduated from VCU School of the Arts.

As of 2022, Azim lives in Seattle.

References

External links
Official site

Virginia Commonwealth University alumni
American people of Bangladeshi descent
American cartoonists
Pulitzer Prize winners
American children's book illustrators
Bangladeshi emigrants to the United States
American women journalists of Asian descent
American writers of Bangladeshi descent

1994 births

Living people